The Technical Alliance was a group of engineers, scientists, and technicians based in New York City, formed towards the end of 1919 by American engineer Howard Scott. The Alliance started an Energy Survey of North America, aimed at documenting the wastefulness of the capitalist system. 

The Technical Alliance advocated a more rational and productive society headed by technical experts, but their survey work failed to have a significant impact. Although some waste was documented, the "prosperity and conservatism of the 1920s undermined the political orientation of the Technical Alliance", and it disbanded in 1921, and the energy survey was not completed.

Members 
The Technical Alliance was by no means a mass organization, but it did have some notable members and technical experts. Apart from Scott, other members of the Technical Alliance included:
 Frederick L. Ackerman
 Carl C. Alsberg
 Alice Barrows
 Allen Carpenter
 Stuart Chase
 L.K. Comstock
 Bassett Jones
 Robert H. Kohn
 Benton MacKaye
 Leland Olds
 Charles P. Steinmetz
 Richard C. Tolman
 John C. Vaughan
 Thorstein Veblen
 Charles H. Whitaker

References

Sources 

 
 
 

Technocracy movement